John Edmondson (1882–unknown) was an English footballer who played in the Football League for Bolton Wanderers and Manchester City.

References

1882 births
English footballers
Association football goalkeepers
English Football League players
Accrington Stanley F.C. (1891) players
Manchester City F.C. players
Bolton Wanderers F.C. players
Year of death missing